Renzo Sclavi (4 October 1923 – 21 August 2018) was an Italian politician for the Italian Democratic Socialist Party.

Biography 
Sclavi was born in Canneto Pavese, Italy on October 4, 1923. Prior to entering politics he was a building contractor who operated a construction company in Stradella, Lombardy which he founded in 1947.

Sclavi was elected to the Italian Senate during legislature IX of Italy from the region of Lombardy for the Italian Democratic Socialist Party. Following the beginning of the Second Republic, he would reach out to Forza Italia politician Gian Carlo Abelli which blossomed into a long-lasting friendship.

He died on August 21, 2018, leaving his construction company in the hands of his children.

References

External links 

 Italian Parliament Page
 Italian Senate Page

1923 births
2018 deaths
People from the Province of Pavia
Members of the Italian Senate from Lombardy
Italian Democratic Socialist Party politicians
Senators of Legislature IX of Italy